Farashband (also Romanized as Farrāshband; also known as Farāsh and Farrāsh) is a city and capital of Farashband County, Fars Province, Iran. At the 2006 census, its population was 17,142, in 3,762 families.

Farashband is one of the Fars province cities which is located 172 km west of Shiraz. It neighbours from the north with Kazeroon, from the west with Booshehr, from the south with Lar and the east with Ghir-Karzin and Firoozabad. The climate is hot and dry, with annual average temperature of 25 °C.

Citrus orchards, especially palm and Ghasb zahedi call into existence some tourism prospects for this region. In addition, the region’s nomads have created a beautiful space and the emergence of the hand-woven like Gabbeh, Glim and Jajim. Language is a mixture of ancient Persian, Lorrish (Bakhtiari-Laky) Mamassani and Kohkilloyehee. But some idioms are different from one village to another. Also the Qashqai language is spoken here, too. Several tribes live in Farashband such as Lorr, Tork and Tajik. 

Nearly 25,000 nomadics inhabit for 7–8 months in pastures every year. Qashqais include some tribes such as Amale, Shesh bluki, Farsimadan, and Ardkapan. Furthermore, there are different tribes of Lorr like Nobenjani, Ghalesefidi, Bakhtiari, sadat fahluanisarruee and Dashti – the rest of the population are of the Tajik tribe. The city has natural gas resources and its economy is based on agriculture, gardening (palm), and carpet weaving. 

Farashband has a history of 1600 years. Monuments left indicate this fact in this city. Despite the great antiquity, due to lack of resources and historical documents, it is considered younger than other cities. People have always believed that the city was created during the reign of Bahram Gur (Sasanian Empire). Monuments with the chahartaq architecture show this fact.

There are several archaeological sites such as: 
Chahar Tagh gangi (four-arched) related to Sassani period
Farrashband’s bath
Chahar Tagh naghare khaneh 
ChaharTagh Rahni5-ChaharTagh Gonbad 
wind mill 
goldsmiths Ghallat related to Afsharian period 

Most tourism prospects and religious area is consist of Konarmalek four-arched, tol gangi four arched, Zayerhosseini four-arched, Khormayak, Gonbad, Ghanatbagh, Rahni four-arched, Barmefarhad spring, Abpa spring, mountain park, emamzade holy shrine (Agham shahid) shahzade tayyeb holy shrine (zeinalabedin), Shahaziz holy shrine (to Baghi), Seyyed Ahmad holy shrine, Seyyed Mohammad holy shrine, Alibakhsi, Pirgheib, Mohamnad (khaniak), Agha Mohammad (khorab), Amir Shahsavar (dezhgah) and Abbolghasem (Dehram) holy shrines.

According to a 1939 publication of the anthropologist Henry Field, 2,000 Circassians lived in Farashband.

References

External links
News Abpa

Populated places in Farashband County

Cities in Fars Province